Charles Collier (May 6, 1947—September 22, 2011) was a radio personality, best known for his many years at radio stations WGAR (AM) and WGAR-FM in Cleveland, Ohio.

Early life
Collier was born on May 6, 1947 in Greenfield, Ohio, and as a boy moved to New Vienna, Ohio.  He is a graduate of New Kenton High School and the University of Cincinnati.

Career
He began his broadcasting career shortly after college, bouncing between jobs in Cincinnati (WSAI), Dayton (WONE), and New York City (WCBS-FM).  He came to Cleveland in 1970, where he worked for WGAR (1220 AM), and later its sister station, WGAR-FM (99.5 FM).  He served the latter part of his tenure as music director/afternoon drive DJ.  After 41 years in the Cleveland radio market, Collier died of a heart attack on September 22, 2011.

In March 2009, Collier was inducted into the Country Radio Hall Of Fame in Nashville, Tennessee — one of only 60 personalities in the history of country radio to achieve this honor.

Awards and honors

2004 Cleveland Association of Broadcasters Hall of Fame inductee
2005 Ohio Broadcasters Hall of Fame inductee
2007 National Association of Broadcasters Marconi Award winner - Large Market Radio Personality of the Year
2009 Country Radio Hall of Fame inductee
Section of Oak Tree Boulevard in Independence, Ohio renamed "Chuck Collier Boulevard" in 2012

References

External links
Country Radio Hall of Fame: Chuck Collier
WGAR.com: Chuck Collier tribute

2011 deaths
Radio personalities from Cleveland
1947 births